The Viasna Human Rights Centre is a human rights organization based in Minsk, Belarus. The organization aims to provide financial and legal assistance to political prisoners and their families, and was founded in 1996 by activist Ales Bialatski in response to large-scale repression of demonstrations by the government of Alexander Lukashenko.

History 
The Viasna Human Rights Centre, registered in Minsk in 1997, was liquidated in October 2003 by a decision of the Supreme Court of the Republic of Belarus. The reason was the participation of the organization's members in observing the 2001 Belarusian presidential election.

In 2005, Bialatski and Viasna won the Homo Homini Award of the Czech NGO People in Need, which recognizes "an individual who is deserving of significant recognition due to their promotion of human rights, democracy and non-violent solutions to political conflicts".

Following a widespread crackdown on political activists protesting a controversial 2010 presidential election criticized by United Nations and European Union observers, both Viasna's offices and Bialatski's home have been repeatedly searched by state security forces.  On 14 February, Bialatski was summoned to the Public Prosecutor's office and warned that as Viasna was an unregistered organization, the government would seek criminal proceedings against it if the group continued to operate.

On 26 November 2012, in accordance with a court ruling against Bialatski, the Minsk office of Viasna was confiscated and sealed by the Belarusian government. Amnesty International described the closure as "a blatant violation of Belarus' international human rights obligations".

Following the 2020–2021 Belarusian protests, the Viasna Human Rights Centre together with the Rehabilitation and Research Centre for Torture Victims, REDRESS and the International Committee for Investigation of Torture in Belarus founded the International Accountability Platform for Belarus. In a joint declaration, 19 states expressed their full support for the establishment of such a platform.

In the ongoing crackdown on independent media and human rights defenders in Belarus, ‘Viasna’ suffered from significant pressure. Leanid Sudalenka, lawyer of the Homieĺ (Gomel) branch of Viasna, Maria Rabkova and Tatsiana Lasitsa, Viasna’s volunteers, were arrested with criminal charges. Rabkova spent more than 6 month in the pre-trial detention. On February 16, 2021, the Investigative Committee searched Viasna’s headquarters in Minsk and regional offices, raided employees' homes. A criminal case against the activists was opened under Article 342, meaning “organising or preparing actions that grossly violate the public order or taking active part in such actions”. Dzmitry Salauyou, board member of ‘Viasna’, was detained and beaten by the police. The persecution of ‘Viasna’ members continues, politically motivated charges have been levelled on Valiantsin Stefanovich, Uladzimir Labkovich and Ales Bialiatski.

In 2022, Viasna founder Bialiatski was awarded the Nobel Peace Prize, along with the organisations Memorial and Centre for Civil Liberties.

References

Literature

External links
Belarusian Human Rights Centre “Viasna” (the official site)
Human Rights Center Viasna: 15 years of persecution

Human rights organizations based in Belarus
International Federation for Human Rights member organizations